Napoléon le Petit (French; literally "Napoleon the Small") was an influential political pamphlet by Victor Hugo, published in 1852. It criticised the rule of Napoleon III and the politics of the Second French Empire for which he left Belgium, and later was expelled of Jersey. Hugo lived in exile in Guernsey for most of Napoleon III's reign and his criticism was significant because he was one of the most prominent Frenchmen of the time and widely respected. 

The work was the first to use the adage that 2 + 2 = 5 as a denial of truth by authority, a notion later used by George Orwell in Nineteen Eighty-Four.

Volumes were smuggled into France (e.g. in bales of hay, and between metal sheets as a tin of sardines), read at secret meetings, and hand-copied.

See also
The Eighteenth Brumaire of Louis Napoleon (1852)

External links
The full text in English, downloadable from Gutenberg.
The full text in French

Works by Victor Hugo
French non-fiction literature
Pamphlets
1852 books
Napoleon III